The 81st Division was a military formation of the People's Liberation Army during and after the Chinese civil war and a part of People's Volunteer Army (Chinese People's Volunteers (CPV) or Chinese Communist Forces (CCF)) during the Korean War. They were a component of the 27th Army.

The 81st Division was created in February 1949 under the Regulation of the Redesignations of All Organizations and Units of the Army, issued by Central Military Commission on November 1, 1948, basing on the 27th Division, 9th Column of Huadong Field Army. Its history could be traced to 3rd Security Brigade of Shandong Military Region, formed on September 3, 1946.

On November 28, 1950, the 80th Division hit the dispersed U.S. units of Task Force Faith with waves of infantry. Despite the presence of tracked antiaircraft weapons, the sub-zero cold and the constant Chinese attacks began to take their toll. The fighting was often hand to hand and convinced the (initial) U.S. Task Force commander, Colonel MacLean, to order a pullback to form a more consolidated defense. However, during the withdrawal operations his troops came under renewed enemy attack, and in the confusion MacLean was captured by the Chinese.

The Task Force Faith page also states that the 81st Division participated in the attack and that though they were possibly reinforced, comprised 15,000+ troops.

In November 1950, Artillery Regiment, 81st Division was activated in Antung, Liaoning.

In October 1952, the division returned to China. Artillery Regiment, 81st Infantry Division detached and transferred to 24th Corps.

In February 1953, Tank Regiment, 81st Infantry Division was activated. On August 17 the regiment was renamed as 286th Tank Self-Propelled Artillery Regiment.

In April 1953, Artillery Regiment, 81st Infantry Division was reactivated in Shanghai. On August 17, the regiment was renamed as 361st Artillery Regiment.

From April 1954, the division was stationed in Zhenjiang, Jiangsu.

In April 1960, the division was renamed as the 81st Army Division.

From June 1962, the maintained as southern army division, category B. By then the division was composed of:
241st Infantry Regiment;
242nd Infantry Regiment;
243rd Infantry Regiment;
361st Artillery Regiment;
286th Tank Self-Propelled Artillery Regiment.

In August 1967, 286th Tank Self-Propelled Artillery Regiment detached from the division to form 10th Tank Division.

In August 1969, the division moved to Handan, Hebei. From then the division maintained as northern army division, category A.

In August 1971, the division was reorganized as a motorized army division. Tank Regiment, 81st Army Division and AAA Regiment, 81st Army Division were activated. By then the division was composed of:
241st Infantry Regiment;
242nd Infantry Regiment;
243rd Infantry Regiment;
Tank Regiment;
Artillery Regiment;
Anti-Aircraft Artillery Regiment.

In August 1985, the division was renamed as the 81st Motorized Infantry Division and reorganized as a motorized division, category B. 250th Infantry Regiment of the disbanding 84th Army Division was attached to the division. Tank Regiment, 81st Division detached to form Tank Brigade, 27th Army. Tank Regiment, 66th Army Corps was transferred to the division as the new Tank Regiment, 81st Division.

By then the division was composed of:
241st Infantry Regiment;
242nd Infantry Regiment;
243rd Infantry Regiment;
250th Infantry Regiment;
Tank Regiment;
Artillery Regiment;
Anti-Aircraft Artillery Regiment.

In September 1989, the division was converted to a northern motorized division, category B. 250th Infantry Regiment was disbanded.

In September 1996, the division was transferred to the People's Armed Police and renamed as the 81st Armed Police Mobile Division:
241st, 242nd, and 243rd Infantry Regiments were converted to 241st, 242nd, and 243rd Armed Police Regiments, respectively;
Tank Regiment, 81st Infantry Division was transferred to 27th Army's direct control as Former Tank Regiment, 81st Division. In September 1998 the regiment was disbanded.
Artillery Regiment and Anti-Aircraft Artillery Regiment were merged into 702nd Armed Police Regiment.

The division was then composed of:
241st Armed Police Regiment - Jinnan District, Tianjin;
242nd Armed Police Regiment - Cangzhou, Hebei;
243rd Armed Police Regiment - Jinnan District, Tianjin;
702nd Armed Police Regiment - Xiqing District, Tianjin.

After the 2017 reform, the division was reduced to a detachment (regiment-sized): the 4th Mobile Detachment under the PAP 1st Mobile Corps.

References

陆军第27集团军军史编纂委员会, 《陆军第27集团军军史》, 1998, p. 805-824

Units and formations of the People's Armed Police